The International Motorsports Hall of Fame (IMHOF) is a hall of fame located adjacent to the  Talladega Superspeedway (formerly Alabama International Motor Speedway) located in Talladega County, east central Alabama. It enshrines those who have contributed the most to motorsports either as a developer, driver, engineer or owner.

History

20th century
The IMHOF was established in early 1970 following NASCAR founder Bill France Sr.'s decision to hire short track racing promoter Don Naman to build a museum and hall of fame in order "to preserve the history of motorsports and to enshrine forever the people who have been responsible for its growth." George Wallace, the Governor of Alabama, formed an 18-member observer commission in 1975 to choose a site and select a design. Following the failure to pass a state-wide referendum on a state bond finance distribution to build the IMHOF, France donated  of land from former race car driver Johnny Ray's family. France opted to build the IMHOF in Alabama rather than in his hometown of Daytona Beach, Florida because Floridian politicians threatened to levy a tax on Daytona International Speedway.

Construction was undertaken with private and federal funding released with new Alabama governor Fob James' approval. The first phase of construction consisted of the building of three of the first six planned buildings on the IMHOF. A groundbreaking ceremony occurred at the site on the afternoon of March 26, 1981, with approximately 100 individuals such as Wallace, Bill France Sr., and Bill France Jr. present. The first half was opened on April 28, 1983, and the second half on July 28, 1990. Track owners International Speedway Corporation (ISC) rented office space from Alabama to run the IMHOF. It has a museum containing racing vehicles, banner, helmet, medals, posters and trophy displays, the ISC offices, and ancillary spaces. The Alabama Sports Writers Hall of Fame; the Automobile Racing Club of America Hall of National Champions; the International Motorsports Hall of Fame; the Quarter Midgets of America Hall of Fame; the Western Auto Mechanics Hall of Fame; and the World Karting Hall of Fame are the six halls of fame on-site. The McCaig-Wellborn International Motorsports Research Library is also contained in the IMHOF.  

Naman had been appointed IMHOF director in 1988, and he began setting out his objective to establish a working hall of fame. The first induction ceremony was broadcast live on The Nashville Network, and was hosted by country music record artist and car sponsor T. G. Sheppard at the Birmingham–Jefferson Civic Center Theater, in Birmingham, Alabama, on the evening of July 25, 1990. Induction ceremonies were held on the Wednesday evening prior to the Winston 500 in October at Talladega before being moved to December for both 1993 and 1994. After the Speedvision Dome was opened in 1996, all subsequent induction ceremonies took place there, four days prior to the Winston Select 500 at Talladega in late April.

Individuals were nominated and voted on by a panel of between 120 and 153 international motorsport writers as well as IMHOF inductees, who selected one or two new members or "old timers" (living inductees) from the nominations list. The nominations list was formed by candidate names sent by panel members, and 20 finalists were chosen, from which all panel members cast preference votes. Until 1996, 10 or more motorsports individuals were inducted annually, before no more than 10 nominees qualified for the final ballot, and a limit of six inductees for every subsequent year was imposed. All nominees had to be retired from participating in their respective categories for at least half a decade; they could be active elsewhere in their respective series in a different capacity. Some active racers could be inducted if they were over the age limit of 61. Individuals had to wait 15 years before become eligible for induction, with a 51 percent vote share required for induction. Unlike other sports halls of fame, waivers were not granted to major racing figures to enable their induction before the five-year waiting period had elapsed.

21st century
A total of 145 individuals were inducted during the period the hall of fame was active in most years from 1990 to 2013. The 20 inaugural members, Buck Baker, Jack Brabham, Malcolm Campbell, Jim Clark, Mark Donohue, Juan Manuel Fangio, France Sr., Graham Hill, Tony Hulman, Junior Johnson, Parnelli Jones, Stirling Moss, Barney Oldfield, Lee Petty, Fireball Roberts, Jackie Stewart, Mickey Thompson, Bobby Unser, and Smokey Yunick, were inducted in 1990. There were three women who were added to the hall of fame. In 1999, Louise Smith, a NASCAR driver during the 1940s and 1950s, became the first woman to be inducted into the hall of fame; the two other female inductees were multiple NHRA Top Fuel dragster champion Shirley Muldowney in 2004, and Janet Guthrie, who was inducted two years later. Wendell Scott, the first African American driver to win a NASCAR Cup Series event in December 1963, was the first African American to be inducted into the hall of fame in 1999. No one was added in each of 1995 and 2010 and nobody has been inducted since 2014.

Inductees

Statistics

See also
 Sears XDH-1: on display at the museum
 Long Beach Motorsports Walk of Fame
 Motorsports Hall of Fame of America
 NASCAR Hall of Fame

Notes

References

External links
 

 
Lists of auto racing people
Automobile museums in Alabama
Sports museums in Alabama
Auto racing museums and halls of fame
Motorsports
Museums in Talladega County, Alabama